Chowk Sarwar Shaheed, previously known as Chowk Munda, is a tehsil in Kot Addu District, Punjab, Pakistan. Chowk Sarwar Shaheed is the headquarters of the tehsil.

Union Councils

History

Beginning 
This region was once a deserted place with a very small human populace. The inhabitants survived on wild fruits and animals. However, with the introduction of a canal system, the area has become well-settled. In the past, there were no crows to be seen here, but now, the area has bloomed into gardens where birds are chirping, and the human population is also increasing.

Location 
Chowk Azam is situated about forty kilometers to the north of this city, and Muzaffargarh District is located about seventy kilometers to the south. Additionally, the city Rangpur is located thirty kilometers away to the east, which is the same region mentioned by Syed Waris Shah in his book, Heer. On the western side, thirty kilometers away, lies an old city called Daira Deen Panah. This town has a unique historical position due to its location almost in the middle of these four cities.

During Mughal rule 
During the Mughal era, forts and outposts were constructed throughout the country for defensive purposes. In this town, a fort was also erected, but due to the passage of time, only remnants of it remain today on the west side of the city and the south side of the middle school. The surrounding area was waterless at that time.

Hindu rule 
In 1840, a Hindu ruler named Dewan Sawan mal had the opportunity to govern this region for about nine years, until 1849.

British rule 
When the British colonized India, they introduced new reforms and administered the system in this area as well.

Why Chowk Sarwar Shaheed is called Chowk Munda 
Two major Baloch tribes, Patal and monda, settled in this region and were protected and supported by the British. Consequently, the area became known as Patal Monda, which later evolved into Munda. According to one tradition, a lame man resided in this town, and "Manda" is the Saraiki word for lame. Thus, the town came to be known as Manda. Another account claims that a well was dug in the area and a little boy (munda) was seen playing on it in the morning. When people tried to catch it, it vanished. However, this appears to be a supernatural tale, and the former explanation seems more plausible. Nevertheless, there is no reliable source to confirm the origin of Munda's name.

Origin of Chowk Sarwar Shaheed name 

This town, previously known as Chowk Munda, was often the subject of ridicule due to its seemingly arbitrary name. The city of Khuni Chowk, located to the north, was renamed to Chowk Azam. The people living in the city had a strong desire for a more meaningful name for their city, as they felt embarrassed when visiting relatives in other areas. Someone asked about munda, which means "baby" in Punjabi, and wondered if he was still young.

Who renamed Chowk Munda as Chowk Sarwar Shaheed and when 
In 1983, during the time of General Zia-ul-Haq, the DC of Muzaffargarh suggested renaming the town to Chowk Sarwar Shaheed, which was liked by the people. The name honored Captain Muhammad Sarwar Shaheed the first son of Pakistan to be martyred on the Kashmir front in 1948. The government awarded him the country's highest honor Nishan e Haider in recognition of his services. The people were pleased with the new name, which honored a martyr, and thus Chowk Munda became Chowk Sarwar Shaheed.

References 

Kot Addu District
Tehsils of Punjab, Pakistan